Scopula ansulata is a moth of the family Geometridae. It was described by Julius Lederer in 1871 and is found in Central Asia.

Subspecies
Scopula ansulata ansulata (Iran)
Scopula ansulata adulteraria (Erschoff, 1874) (Turkestan)
Scopula ansulata characteristica (Alphéraky, 1883) (Kuldscha)
Scopula ansulata eberti Wiltshire, 1967 (Afghanistan)

References

Moths described in 1871
ansulata
Moths of Asia